The British Association for Counselling and Psychotherapy (BACP) is a professional body for counsellors and psychotherapists practising in the United Kingdom.

History
Originally founded in 1977 as the British Association for Counselling, aided by a grant from the Home Office Voluntary Service Unit, it had  emerged from the Standing Conference for the Advancement of Counselling. This body was inaugurated in 1970 at the instigation of the National Council for Voluntary Organisations.

In 1978, the headquarters were relocated from London to Rugby courtesy of the National Marriage Guidance Council which provided free accommodation to help the association establish itself. The Association is now located in Lutterworth.

In September 2000, the Association recognised that it no longer represented only those involved in counselling, but also psychotherapy, and changed its name to the British Association for Counselling and Psychotherapy.

In September 2017, the branding was refreshed introducing a new logo, colour scheme, typeface and the slogan "counselling changes lives", based on a belief in the impact and benefits of the profession. This was Highly Commended in the 2018 memcom membership excellence awards stating that it "found success over various mediums" and "had a clear rationale for the brand relaunch and a strong proposition that counselling changes lives".

In November 2019, the membership was reported to have surpassed 50,000, prompting the Association to share celebratory and rewarding comments from its members as a way to mark the achievement.

Governance
BACP is a company limited by guarantee and a registered charity, monitored by the Charity Commission to ensure that aims are charitable and funds used for the benefit of its members and communities in which they are active. BACP follows the Charity Commission's Charity Governance Code as a tool for continuous improvement.

The governing instrument is the Memorandum and Articles of the Association.

The Trustees, known collectively as the Board of Governors, govern the Association.

Committees 
BACP operates six committees, with volunteer input, to oversee the activities of the association:

 Audit, Risk and Performance Committee
 Finance and Policy Committee
 Membership and Professional Standards Committee
 Public Protection Committee
 Remuneration and Governance Committee
 Research Committee

Operations 
BACP works with commissioners and government to promote the counselling professions, seeking to advise and inform national and international policy and procedures concerned with counselling and psychotherapy, offering information and guidance to involved parties. BACP is consulted by government bodies, professional bodies, funding organisations, teaching institutions and many others on important issues concerning counselling and psychotherapy.

The Association sets and maintains standards for the profession. The Ethical Framework for Good Practice in Counselling and Psychotherapy along with the Professional Conduct Procedure is intended to ensure that members of BACP abide by an accepted code of conduct and accountability. The Association accredits counsellors with the appropriate training and experience via a rigorous accreditation process that requires continued education to maintain accreditation.

In October 2015, the Collaboration of the Counselling and Psychotherapy Professions (CCPP) was announced between BACP, BPC and UKCP. Whilst promising to maintain their unique differences, each organisation expressed their recognition of shared goals and a commitment to improving the nation's mental health and wellbeing.

In June 2017, BACP presented their Female Genital Mutilation (FGM) research as a paper at the Society for Psychotherapy Research conference in Canada. Key research papers, including the FGM paper and a paper analysing data from the National Audit of Psychological Therapies, were published gold open access.

In March 2018, BACP and the SQA announced a unique partnership which promises to improve access to the counselling profession for students in Scotland through a new BACP Approved Qualification scheme.

Strategic priorities 
Following consultation with their members and stakeholders, BACP identified three key areas for particular focus where the value of counselling has the greatest potential to improve lives.

 Older people
 Four nations
 Children, young people and families

Specialist interest divisions 
BACP represent and promote specialist areas of interest within the profession by operating seven divisions, each managed by an executive committee of volunteers which run their own meetings and formulate strategies in line with BACP objectives, overseen by the BACP Board of Governors.

 Children, young people and families
Healthcare
 Workplace
 Coaching
 Higher and further education
 Spiritual and pastoral
 Private Practice

Regulation
Although counselling and psychotherapy are not statutorily regulated professions, BACP works alongside other associations to advise and appeal to government in attempts to ensure members of the public who access the counselling professions are safeguarded.

The BACP is registered for accreditation under the scheme set up by the Department of Health and regulated by the Professional Standards Authority for Health and Social Care. The Accredited status of the BACP Register is reviewed annually by the Professional Standards Authority to ensure that the highest standards are being met and good practices are being followed.

Publications

Therapy Today 
The organisation's Therapy Today magazine, with a circulation of 44,386 (ABC Jan – Dec 2016), is the most widely read specialist magazine for counsellors and psychotherapists in the UK, and has a strong international presence, publishing articles on topics crossing the breadth of counselling and psychotherapy practice, modalities and theoretical approaches.

Journals  
The BACP publishes eight member-only journals:

 Counselling and Psychotherapy Research
 BACP Children, Young People and Families
 BACP Workplace
 Coaching Today
 Healthcare Counselling and Psychotherapy
 Private Practice
 Thresholds
 University and College Counselling

Notable people
Sue Bailey, DBE, Psychiatrist, BACP Vice-President
Helen Bamber, OBE, Psychotherapist, BACP Patron 2011–2016
Luciana Berger, Politician, BACP Vice-President
H.J. Blackham, Founder, and "architect of modern humanism"
Fiona Caldicott, DBE, Psychiatrist, former BACP President
Cary Cooper, CBE, Psychologist, Honorary BACP President 1976–1979
Derek Draper, Psychotherapist, former lobbyist and former editor of the LabourList website
Shreela Flather, Politician, former BACP Vice-President
Phillip Hodson, Journalist
Esther Rantzen, Television presenter, former BACP Vice-President
John Rowan, Psychologist
Diane Youdale, Psychotherapist, television personality

See also
Mental health in the United Kingdom
British Psychoanalytic Council
United Kingdom Council for Psychotherapy

References

External links
BACP

Counseling organizations
Lutterworth
Health in Leicestershire
Learned societies of the United Kingdom
Mental health organisations in the United Kingdom
Organisations based in Leicestershire
Organizations established in 1977
Psychotherapy in the United Kingdom
1977 establishments in the United Kingdom